The 1999 D.C. United season was the clubs' fifth year of existence, as well as their fourth season in Major League Soccer.

Following shortcomings in MLS Cup '98, United took winning the league championship as their top priority entering 1999. With Bruce Arena's departure to coach the United States men's national team, Dutch coach Thomas Rongen took the helm as United head coach. Rongen's maiden campaign with United proved by incredibly successful, as United earned their third MLS Cup title, and their second MLS Supporters Shield.

The success of the league double culminating two previous MLS Cups, a Supporters Shield and the CONCACAF Champions' Cup was considered the apex of being tie-free until the mid to late 2000s. Their dominance in the league was cut short the year following strict salary cap restrictions enforced by MLS to ensure parity amongst clubs. Consequently, it resulted in certain core United players becoming too expensive for the club to retain, weakening the squad.

With the subsequent changes to the 1999 season, United would not qualify for the MLS Cup Playoffs again until 2003.

Background

Review

Competitions

Major League Soccer

Standings

Eastern Conference

Overall Table

Results summary

Results by round

Match results

MLS Cup Playoffs

Conference semifinals 

D.C. United win in the series 2–0.

Conference finals 

D.C. United win in the series 2–1.

MLS Cup

CONCACAF Champions Cup

Match results

Statistics

Appearances and goals

Numbers after plus–sign (+) denote appearances as a substitute.

Transfers

References 

1999
Dc United
Dc United
D.C. United
MLS Cup champion seasons
Supporters' Shield winning seasons